The Individual freestyle test grade IV equestrian event at the 2004 Summer Paralympics was competed on 24 September. It was won by Ann Cathrin Lubbe, representing .

Final round
24 Sept. 2004, 14:00

References

2004 Summer Paralympics events